International Dialogues on Underwater Munitions (IDUM) is a non-governmental organization (NGO) founded in Canada in 2004, and established as a Dutch Foundation in The Hague, The Netherlands in 2014. The IDUM was founded by Terrance P. Long CPSM.SSM. CD., a retired Canadian Military Engineer with more than thirty years experience having served in Explosive Ordnance Disposal (EOD) Centre Chief, and demining expert all over the world. His expertise and passion for marine ecosystems led to the birth of IDUM.

IDUM is Accredited too: 

 NATO Science for pease and Security  - MODUM Program, Sopot, Poland
 International Seabed Authority (ISA) for Law of the Sea, Kingston, Jamaica
 OSPAR Commission for the Protection of the North-East Atlantic Oceans, London, England  
 HELCOM Helsinki Commission for the Protection of the Baltic Sea, Helsinki, Finland
 Organisation for the Prohibition of Chemical Weapons (OPCW), Chemical Weapons Convention (CWC), The Hague, The Netherlands
 United Nations High-level Summits for Sustainable Development Goal 13 Climate Action, UN New York  
 United Nations High-level Summits for Sustainable Development Goal 14 Life Below Water, UN New York
 United Nations Oceans Conferences, UN New York and Lisbon 2022

Mission and activity 

IDUM’s mission is to promote the creation of an Internationally Binding Treaty for the environmental friendly global eradication all classes (biological, chemical, conventional, and radiological) of underwater munitions from the seas. This treaty would encourage countries to collaborate on underwater munitions research, science, and policy including environmentally friendly remediation in the affected regions. IDUM is an internationally recognized body where all stakeholders (diplomats, government departments including external affairs, environmental protection and fishery, fossil fuel and fishing industry, salvage divers, militaries, and others) can come together in an open and transparent forum to discuss underwater munitions, seek solutions, and promote international cooperation on related issues.

Since the creation of the foundation, IDUM has successfully hosted five international dialogues on Sea Dumped Weapons (SDW) related issues. Their work is recognized by inter-governmental institutions such as the United Nations (UN) and the Organization for the Prohibition of Chemical Weapons (OPCW). The UN identified their work in the 2014 ‘UN Resolution on Sea Dumped Munitions’ and in the 2013 Secretary General’s report titled ‘Cooperative Measures on Sea Dumped Chemical Munitions.‘ In 2014, the OPCW report titled ‘Third Review Conference of State Parties’ outlined the need for international cooperation on SDWs. Apart from working to bring together the various stakeholders that can create effective policy responses to SDWs, IDUM has been active in collaborative research as well. Their work seeks to expand knowledge on the detrimental impacts of SDWs, as well as detection, and removal procedures and technologies. IDUM have published a two-part co-edited journal titled ‘The Legacy of Underwater Munitions: Policy and the Science of Assessment, Evaluation of Impacts and Potential Response’ in the Marine Technology Society Journal (MTS) and have helped to create two international documentaries that IDUM is featured in titled ‘Deadly Depths‘ (which won best international documentary at the German Green Screen Film Fest in 2014), and ‘Foot Prints of War.’

Projects

Decision Aid for Marine Munitions (DAIMON) 

Co-Director - Partner, The project which aimed to support maritime, defense and environmental administrations in making decisions on management strategies for dumped chemical and conventional warfare in the Baltic Sea, and the Skagerrak to assess the risk associated with corroding warfare objects, such as dumped containers filled with munitions. DAIMON will focus on the evaluation of risks associated with individual munitions, categorization of threats, and possible remediation methods. Economical and legal issues will also be addressed. Risk assessment/categorization methods will be applied in field studies in the Gulf of Finland, Bornholm and Gdańsk Deeps, Little Belt, and Skagerrak to produce examples of evaluation in different regions of the Baltic Sea. As the main result, an easy-to-use software, based on the research carried out within the project, will be presented to stakeholders (maritime administration, environmental agencies, etc.) in the Baltic Sea countries to provide them with a tool for the efficient management of the problem in their respective exclusive economic zones. The tool aims at making the knowledge gained in previous projects related to dumped munitions available to decision makers in the Baltic Sea area.  Project activities:

 Performing both laboratory and in-situ experiments to assess the potential impacts of munitions on the Baltic Sea ecosystem. Food safety will also be addressed.
 Pilot studies evaluating the risk associated with selected warfare objects, e.g., wrecks filled with chemical munitions and single corroding chemical and conventional munitions on the sea bottom. Designation of objects for removal.
 Assessment of the different remediation techniques on the designated objects regarding their impact on the environment and their costs vs. costs of no-action.

Chemical Munitions Search & Assessment (CHEMSEA) 

Chemical Munitions, Search and Assessment (CHEMSEA) is a flagship project of the Baltic Sea Region Strategy, financed by the EU Baltic Sea Region Programme 2007-2013. The project was initiated in autumn 2011 and will last through early 2014. It has a budget of €4.5M, which is part-financed by the European Union through the European Regional Development Fund. Goals that were formulated for the project:

 Production of detailed maps of the Gotland and Gdansk Deep dumpsites including location of munitions and areas of contaminated sediments and potentially affected benthic fauna
 Assessment of the toxicity of CWA degradation products to aquatic life based on in-situ and laboratory studies
 Development of a model predicting the magnitude and direction of leakage events
 Integrated assessment of ecosystem risks from CWA dumps
 Development of novel, unified methodologies for CWA and CWA degradation product analysis to be used in all Baltic countries
 Formulation of guidelines for different target groups for use when working with contaminated Baltic sediments

MODUM - NATO Science for Peace and Security 

Co-Director - Partner, The project with the motto "Towards the monitoring of dumped munitions threat" aims the establishment of the monitoring network observing Chemical Weapons dumpsites in the Baltic Sea, using Autonomous Underwater Vehicles (AUVs)and Remotely Operated Underwater Vehicles (ROVs), and utilizing existing research vessels of partner institutions as launching platforms. The project consists of the test phase, which will serve to choose best available solutions for the difficult Baltic Sea environment, Survey phase, which will locate actual objects of concern, and monitoring phase, which will concentrate on the collection of environmental data close to the objects of concern. The project will concentrate on three representative areas chosen during the first phase of the project and will provide a solution for expanding such a network to all areas of concern in the Baltic Sea area. Performed monitoring activities will include habitat status evaluation, fish health studies, and modeling of possible threats to adjacent areas. https://www.youtube.com/watch?v=e4F3BtNaiSo

The Pentarius Deep Sub Project 

The Deep Sub submersible is engineered to go to 36,000′ of depth – 16,000 PSI or 1100 Atmospheres. The pressure hull is built of carbon fiber with an aluminum dome at the back end and a fused quartz dome at the front. The fused quartz is a man-made ingot that has taken over three years to machine from a 2800 lb ingot to a 550 lb hemisphere. The dome offers an unprecedented view – no one on the seafloor has ever had a view like this. The rest of the sub is “flooded” – water is around the components. Important items are filled with oil but are still exposed to the full pressure. This includes the batteries, servos, and electric motors that are used for motion on the seafloor. Syntactic foam, a special buoyancy material, makes up the rest of the volume of the sub. The sub’s instruments include high-def sonar, video, and chemical sensors. Together, they will allow scientists to paint a full picture of the deep environment based on an unprecedented amount of raw data.

Partnerships 

United Nations
Organization for Prohibition of Chemical Weapons
North Atlantic Treaty Organization
European Union
General Inspectorate for Environment
Centers for Disease Control and Prevention
Helsinki Commission
Polish Naval Academy
Finland Ministry of the Environment
Swedish Coast Guard

References

External links 

 

Organizations established in 2004